The Presbytery of Boston is the regional governing body for congregations located in the Greater Boston area affiliated with the Presbyterian Church (USA). Established in 1745 and with an office in Clinton, Massachusetts, the Presbytery of Boston currently includes 24 member churches located in Worcester, Norfolk, and Suffolk counties, and parts of Essex County. The Presbytery of Boston is one of 22 presbyteries that comprise the Synod of the Northeast, which oversees 1,130 churches in New Jersey, New York, and the New England states.

History 
In the mid-18th century, the Presbytery of Londonderry was the sole presbytery in New England. On 16 April 1745, the Presbytery of Boston was established by three local ministers. In 1748, the Rev. Jonathan Parsons, minister of Salem Presbyterian Church, joined the presbytery. By 1768, the presbytery had 12 ministers.

Demographics 

In 2002, the Presbytery of Boston had 3,103 members and 23 congregations. By 2010, there were 2,993 members, a 3% decline, and 25 churches. In 2010, the Presbytery of Boston was 61% White, 21% Asian, 13% African American, 4% Hispanic, .3% Native American and .3% Middle Eastern.

Member churches 

There are 23 chartered congregations and 6 new worshiping communities in the Presbytery of Boston.

Beverly
 Pilgrim Church
 Gateway Church
Boston
 Church of the Covenant, Downtown Boston
 Fourth Presbyterian Church, South Boston
 Hyde Park Presbyterian Church, Hyde Park
 Primera Iglesia Presbiteriana Hispana de Boston, Jamaica Plain
 Roxbury Presbyterian Church, Roxbury
Brockton
 Shekinah Presbyterian Church in Brockton
Brookline
 First Presbyterian Church
 Korean Church of Boston
Burlington
 Burlington Presbyterian Church
Cambridge
 First United Presbyterian Church
Clinton
 Clinton Presbyterian Church
Easton
 Good Shepherd Presbyterian Church
Natick
 Hartford Street Presbyterian Church
 Shekinah Presbyterian Church in Natick
Needham
 Needham Presbyterian Church
Newton
 Newton Presbyterian Church
 Taiwan Presbyterian Church of Greater Boston
Norwood
 Shekinah Presbyterian Church in Norwood
Quincy
 First Presbyterian Church
 Quincy Young Sang Presbyterian Church
Somerville
 Clarendon Hill Presbyterian Church
Sudbury
 Sudbury Presbyterian Church
Waltham
 First Presbyterian Church
Whitinsville
 United Presbyterian Church of Whitinsville
Worcester
 First Presbyterian Church
 Christaller Presbyterian Fellowship

Former churches 
 Federal Street Church, Downtown Boston (became Congregationalist in 1786)
 First Presbyterian Church, Boston (founded 1853, now closed)
 First Presbyterian Church, East Boston (founded 1853, closed 1996)
 First United Presbyterian Church, Boston (founded 1846, now closed)
 Fort Square Presbyterian Church, Quincy (joined the Covenant Order of Evangelical Presbyterians (ECO) in 2016)
 Hanover Street Church, Boston
 Second Presbyterian Church, Boston
 Third Presbyterian Church, Boston (founded 1870, now closed)

Notable clergy 
 Lyman Beecher (1775-1863) was pastor at Hanover Street Church in Boston from 1826 to 1833
 Jonathan Parsons (1705-1776) was pastor of the Presbyterian church in Newburyport and a supporter of the American Revolution (at the time Newburyport was part of the Presbytery of Boston)

See also 
 Presbytery of Northern New England

References 

Presbyterian organizations established in the 18th century
1745 establishments in Massachusetts
Religious organizations established in 1745
Presbyterianism in Massachusetts
Presbyterian Church (USA) presbyteries